Horsfieldia pandurifolia is a species of plant in the family Myristicaceae. It is endemic to China.  It is threatened by habitat loss.

References

Flora of China
pandurifolia
Endangered plants
Taxonomy articles created by Polbot